Xili,, an area of Nanshan District, Shenzhen, South China, covers an area of , with the population of 210,000 or more, including household population of 19,323. It has eight communities - Dakan, Makan, Baimang, Lihu, Xinwei, Xili, Shuguang and Songping Shan. The bordering areas are Taoyuan (Grand Sand River as the boundary), Yuehai (Beihuan Expressway as the boundary) and Nantou (Unicorn Road as the boundary) communities and Bao'an District. Tang Lang New Village, is also found in Xili. University Town of Shenzhen, apartments for migrant workers and the Xili People's Hospital are located in the area.

Education
 Municipal schools
Shenzhen Second Senior High School (深圳市第二高级中学) - Xili

See also
 University Town of Shenzhen

References

Subdistricts of Shenzhen
Nanshan District, Shenzhen